is a Japanese television program that airs on Friday nights at 11:17 pm on the Asahi Broadcasting Corporation channel.

The premise of the show is of a Detective Agency which takes requests from the viewers. The 'detectives' on the show go on an investigation, which typically involves searching for people/places, street surveys, local reports, overcoming fears and experiments. The detective is typically accompanied by the viewer who made the request. The show is based out of the city of Osaka but frequently involves travel to other parts of Japan. Food-related requests are often brought to the professional celebrity chef Hayashi Hirohito.

Koeda Katsura, a rakugo performer, was a regular comedian on the show for 25 years until an incident referred to as the "pudding affair" occurred, which involved pictures released of Katsura lying in bed partially covered with pudding.

Cast
"Chairman"
Ryūtarō Kamioka (1988–2000)
Toshiyuki Nishida (2001–2019)
Hitoshi Matsumoto (2019–present)
"Secretary"
Chiaki Matsubara (1988–1989)
Mari Okabe (1989–2010)
Erika Matsuo (2010–2018)
Saori Masuda (2019–present)

See also
 Television in Japan

References

External links
  

1988 Japanese television series debuts
1980s Japanese television series
1990s Japanese television series
2000s Japanese television series
2010s Japanese television series
2020s Japanese television series
Asahi Broadcasting Corporation original programming
Japanese variety television shows